The Episcopal Diocese of New York is a diocese of the Episcopal Church in the United States of America, encompassing three New York City boroughs and seven New York state counties. Established in 1785, it is one of the Episcopal Church's original dioceses. The current diocesan bishop is the Rt. Rev. Andrew Dietsche, whose seat is at the Cathedral of Saint John the Divine.

Overview
The Diocese of New York contains approximately 190 places of worship in the New York City boroughs of Manhattan, the Bronx and Staten Island and the New York state counties of Dutchess, Orange, Putnam, Rockland, Sullivan, Ulster and Westchester. Beyond New York City, the diocese is divided into two regions (Region II and the Mid-Hudson Region), which are made up of geographical deaneries, each of which is known as a "clericus".

The diocese was established in 1785 after the Anglican Church was disestablished following the American Revolution, and is one of the nine original dioceses of the Episcopal Church. It is one of ten dioceses, plus the Convocation of Episcopal Churches in Europe, that make up Province 2.

The diocese is led by the Rt. Rev. Andrew Dietsche, 16th Bishop of New York, who is assisted by the Rt. Rev. Allen K. Shin as bishop suffragan and the Rt. Rev. Mary Glasspool as assistant bishop. Dietsche is expected to retire in 2024 and will be succeeded as diocesan bishop by the Rev. Matthew Heyd, currently rector of the Church of the Heavenly Rest in New York City.

The Bishop's seat is the Cathedral of St. John the Divine on Amsterdam Avenue in Manhattan, where the diocesan offices are also located. The national headquarters of the Episcopal Church are also located in the diocese, at 815 Second Avenue.

The diocese has approximately 50,000 members and 500 canonically resident priests.

History

Colonial and revolutionary period
Anglicanism in New York can be traced to the English acquisition of the territory from the Dutch Republic in the latter part of the 17th century. In 1664 the English king, Charles II, awarded the Province of New York to his brother, the Duke of York (later James II), and English rule over New York was firmly established by 1674. Initially, since James II was a Roman Catholic, little was done to promote the Church of England in New York, but in 1683 the New York Charter of Liberties and Privileges was adopted, guaranteeing religious tolerance and liberty, and, after the Glorious Revolution, the English monarchy actively promoted the growth of the Church of England in the province. In 1693 it became the province's established church, although certain accommodations were made for the Dutch Reformed Church.

In 1693, the first Anglican parish in New York, St. Peters Church, was founded in what was the town of Westchester (today Westchester Square in the Bronx) followed a year later by Trinity Church in lower Manhattan. With royal patronage and the assistance of the Society for the Propagation of the Gospel in Foreign Parts, other churches were founded in the ensuing decades, such as Grace Church (now Christ's Church) in Rye in 1705.

As Anglicanism grew in New York and throughout the American colonies, the Church of England began to see the need to establish an episcopate in the Americas. This plan caused fear among a number of colonists and may have contributed to the American Revolution. The Church's involvement in the creation of King's College (now Columbia University) and its large endowment, far surpassing all other colonial colleges of the period, added to the fear of creating an episcopacy and of Crown influence in America through the College.

During the Revolution, many thought that the Church harbored loyalties to George III. It has been estimated that as many as 90 percent of Anglican clergymen in the diocese remained loyal to the Crown during the revolution.

Post-revolutionary period

After the Revolution, the Church was disestablished and a number of prominent clergymen were imprisoned, including Samuel Seabury, rector of St. Peter’s in the Bronx, who later became the first Bishop of Connecticut.

After an act was passed in Parliament whereby the English bishops were empowered to confer the episcopate upon men who were not subject to the British Crown, Samuel Provoost was consecrated as the first Bishop of New York in 1787. Two years later, the Episcopal Church formally separated from the Church of England so that its clergy would not be required to take an oath of allegiance to the Crown.

The selection of Provoost served to mollify anti-Anglican sentiments that had arisen during the Revolution. In his Addresses on the History of the United States Senate, Senator Robert Byrd noted that in the years before the Revolution Provoost "was a passionate Whig, and his sympathy for the colonies against English rule did not sit well with his wealthy loyalist congregation. Before long, his patriotism cost him his parish. During the Revolution, Provoost ... narrowly escaped capture and death at the hands of the British". Having thus established his revolutionary credentials, Provoost was chosen as the first chaplain of the United States Senate in 1789, when the government was based in New York. Immediately following his inauguration as the first President of the United States, George Washington, together with members of Congress, proceeded to St. Paul's Chapel, where Provoost led a service of prayer for the new government.

Later history

In the 1830s and 1840s the Oxford Movement caused controversies and divisions within the diocese, as it did elsewhere within the Episcopal Church and the broader Anglican communion. In New York, the divisions crystallized in a dispute over the ordination of Arthur Carey. A graduate of the General Theological Seminary, Carey had been greatly influenced by the Tracts for the Times, and as his ordination approached, he was opposed by a number of clergy and laity. Benjamin Onderdonk and other presbyters conducted an examination of Carey, which ultimately found him fit for ordination, and he was thus ordained in 1843. The dispute did not end, however, and a number of letters were published accusing Carey and ultimately Onderdonk of being overly sympathetic to Roman Catholicism. The controversy spread beyond the diocese, and at least one other diocese adopted a resolution condemning Onderdonk.

As the controversy continued, charges were presented to the House of Bishops alleging that Onderdonk had committed an "immoral act" with a Mrs. Butler and other women (charges of intoxication were also mentioned, but downplayed). After a trial, the House of Bishops suspended Onderdonk in 1845. Whether or not this was the result of the dispute over the issues raised by the Carey affair was hotly debated at the time, in a series of tracts and published letters of the parties involved.

After Onderdonk's suspension, the episcopacy was vacant for seven years until Jonathan Mayhew Wainwright I was called as Provisional Bishop in 1852. The healing work that he began in the diocese was continued by his successor, Horatio Potter, under whose leadership the Episcopal Church continued to grow. As a result of this growth, it was decided to split the diocese into four separate areas in 1868, with the creation of the dioceses of Long Island, Albany and Western New York.

Under Potter's nephew and successor, Henry Codman Potter, plans were developed and, after much deliberation, a site was chosen for the construction of the Cathedral of St. John the Divine, in the Morningside Heights area of Manhattan. The cornerstone was laid in 1892 and the Cathedral was consecrated and opened for worship in 1911.

Since the late 19th century, and especially in the mid-to-late 20th century, the diocese has been noted for its social activism, with Bishops Horace Donegan and Paul Moore, for example, prominent advocates of the civil rights movement. It was under Donegan that the diocese permitted women to serve on vestries and ordained its first women deacons and priests. The late 20th and early 21st centuries have been marked by increased diversity. During Bishop Mark Sisk's tenure, Japanese- and Spanish-speaking congregations were established, and, as of 2022, worship services were offered in the diocese in at least 10 languages, including Spanish, French, Chinese, Japanese, Korean and Igbo. In 1996 Episcopal Charities was founded to fund local programs and, as of 2022, has provided some $17 million in support.

Bishops of New York
The following have served as diocesan bishops, provisional bishops, bishops coadjutor, bishops suffragan or assistant bishops in the Diocese of New York:

Diocesan bishops

Bishops suffragan

Assistant bishops

Churches

As of 2022, there were approximately 190 Episcopal places of worship in the diocese, located in the New York boroughs of Manhattan, the Bronx and Staten Island and in the New York state counties of Dutchess, Orange, Putnam, Rockland, Sullivan and Ulster and Westchester. They include the following, some of which may no longer be active:

New York City

Manhattan

Staten Island

The Bronx

Dutchess County

Orange County

Putnam County

Rockland County

Sullivan County

Ulster County

Westchester County

Educational and other institutions

Schools
The following schools are located within the Diocese of New York and affiliated with the Episcopal Church:

Spiritual communities
Anglican spiritual communities and religious orders active within the Diocese of New York include:

References

 

Episcopal Diocese of New York
Episcopal Church in New York (state)
New York
New York
Province 2 of the Episcopal Church (United States)
Christianity in New York City
Episcopal bishops of New York
Religious organizations established in 1785